Sylvain Richard Cloutier (born February 13, 1974) is a Canadian former professional ice hockey centre. He is the elder brother of Dan Cloutier.

Career
Cloutier played junior hockey for the Guelph Storm of the Ontario Hockey League from 1991 to 1994, scoring 237 points and 106 goals while also serving as team captain. He was drafted 70th overall by the Detroit Red Wings in the 1992 NHL Entry Draft and spent the next four seasons playing in the American Hockey League for the Adirondack Red Wings but never managed to make Detroit's main lineup. He would go on to play seven NHL games for the Chicago Blackhawks in the 1998–99 NHL season, scoring no points.

Cloutier joined the Coventry Blaze of the United Kingdom's Elite Ice Hockey League in 2006 and helped the team win the Elite League title. In 2008, he won his second Elite League title with the Blaze. He then became the head coach of the Corpus Christi IceRays in the Central Hockey League before being let go in February 2009. Afterwards, he returned to the Elite League and became player-coach for the Hull Stingrays. Cloutier became a popular player for the Stingrays and as such his number 83 was retired by the Hull Pirates, the successor team for the Stingrays following their liquidation in 2015..

On July 18, 2015, Cloutier was hired as the head coach and general manager of the Bradford Rattlers Junior 'A' Hockey Club in the Greater Metro Junior 'A' Hockey League (GMHL).

Career statistics

References

External links

1974 births
Adirondack Frostbite players
Adirondack IceHawks players
Adirondack Red Wings players
Albany River Rats players
Canadian ice hockey centres
Chicago Blackhawks players
Coventry Blaze players
Detroit Red Wings draft picks
Detroit Vipers players
Guelph Storm players
HC Ambrì-Piotta players
Houston Aeros (1994–2013) players
Hull Stingrays players
Ice hockey people from Quebec
Ice hockey player-coaches
Indianapolis Ice players
Living people
Orlando Solar Bears (IHL) players
People from Mont-Laurier
Syracuse Crunch players
Toledo Storm players
Canadian expatriate ice hockey players in England